Udea rhododendronalis is a species of moth in the family Crambidae. It is found in  France, Spain, Italy, Switzerland, Austria, Serbia and Montenegro, the Republic of Macedonia, Bulgaria, Greece, Albania and Turkey.

References

Moths described in 1834
rhododendronalis
Moths of Europe
Moths of Asia